Verein is a German word, sometimes translated as union, club or association, and may refer to:

 Eingetragener Verein (e. V.), a registered voluntary association under German law
 Swiss Verein, a voluntary association under Swiss law, not necessarily registered

See also 
 Association (disambiguation)
 Verein für Socialpolitik, a society of economists in the German-speaking area
 Voluntary association